Luis Fernando Centi (born 16 September 1976) is an Italian footballer who plays as a midfielder.

He is of Colombian descent because his mother is from Colombia.

Club career
Centi was signed by Ascoli Calcio 1898 on 23 January 2007.

References

External links
 
 AIC profile 

1976 births
Living people
People from Savona
Italian footballers
Serie A players
Serie B players
Serie C players
Piacenza Calcio 1919 players
A.C. Carpi players
Aurora Pro Patria 1919 players
S.S.D. Varese Calcio players
Como 1907 players
F.C. Lumezzane V.G.Z. A.S.D. players
U.S. Livorno 1915 players
Treviso F.B.C. 1993 players
Atalanta B.C. players
Ascoli Calcio 1898 F.C. players
S.P.A.L. players
A.S.D. Gallipoli Football 1909 players
Association football midfielders
Italian people of Colombian descent
Sportspeople of Colombian descent
Footballers from Liguria
Sportspeople from the Province of Savona